Piecemeal denotes something being done piece by piece or one stage at a time.

Piecemeal may also refer to:
 Piecemeal (Gilbert Benson), a fictional character in the Marvel Universe
 Piecemeal (Cyborg villain), another fictional character in the Marvel Universe
 Piecemeal necrosis, a necrosis that occurs in fragments

See also 

 Peasemeal